Dr. John Hugh Gillis Regional High School (often referred to as The Regional) is a secondary school located in Antigonish, Nova Scotia, Canada. It is attended by approximately 775 students in grades 9 to 12. The school used to fall under the jurisdiction of the Strait Regional School Board, until the school board system was cancelled on the 2018–19 school year. Dr. John Hugh Gillis Regional High School was ranked fourth among Nova Scotian schools in 2009.

Name
The school was formerly known as Antigonish Regional High School, but the name was changed in the mid 1980s to honour a superintendent forced into retirement due to illness.

Sports
The school's sports teams are nicknamed the Royals or sometimes the Regional Royals, and since the school name change that came into effect in 1985, the school is often referred to as Doctor J. Two programs, women's basketball and X-Country, have been especially successful over the years.

International Baccalaureate Programme
The school began teaching the International Baccalaureate (IB) Diploma Program in September 2007. It has been an IB World School since April 2007 (IB World School Code 002932). Currently, it offers Biology HL/SL Chemistry HL/SL, English Literature HL, German Literature SL, Korean Literature SL, French B HL/SL, History HL/SL, Mathematics SL, Physics HL/SL, Economics HL, Theory of Knowledge (TOK), Visual Arts HL/SL, Music HL/SL.

Notable former pupils

 Eric Gillis, athlete
 Al MacIsaac, ice hockey executive and former player
 Paul MacLean (ice hockey), ice hockey coach and former player

References

External links
 Dr. John Hugh Gillis Regional High School Official Website
 Strait Regional School Board Website
 Dr. John Hugh Gillis Regional  Link to the school's page on the IB website

High schools in Nova Scotia
Schools in Antigonish County, Nova Scotia
Antigonish, Nova Scotia
Educational institutions established in 1970
International Baccalaureate schools in Nova Scotia